The Crooked River is a perennial river of the Mitchell River catchment, located in the Alpine region of the Australian state of Victoria.

Location and features
The river flows in a highly meandering course, generally south by west, joined by two minor tributaries before reaching its confluence with the Wongungarra River between the small settlements of Howittville and Winchester, within the Alpine National Park in the Shire of Wellington. The river descends  over its  course.

Etymology

In the Australian Aboriginal Brabralung dialect of the Gunai language, two variant names for the Crooked River are given as Dow-wirra, meaning "dry tree"; and Nirlung, meaning "plenty of water-hens".

See also

 List of rivers in Australia

References

External links
 
 

East Gippsland catchment
Rivers of Gippsland (region)
Rivers of Hume (region)
Victorian Alps